Journal of Mathematics Teacher Education is a peer-reviewed scientific journal within the field of mathematics education. The journal was founded by Thomas J. Cooney, and it first appeared in 1998. Published by Springer, the journal normally appears in 6 annual issues. The journal is paginated by volume.

According to the official description of the journal, it "is devoted to research that seeks to improve the education of mathematics teachers and develop teaching methods that better enable mathematics students to learn".

Associate editors
As of January 2013, the following served as associate editors for the journal:

 Olive Chapman, Editor-in-Chief, University of Calgary, Canada
 Gwendolyn Lloyd, Pennsylvania State University, USA
 Joao Pedro da Ponte, University of Lisbon, Portugal 
 Despina Potari, University of Athens, Greece
 Margaret Walshaw, Massay University, New Zealand

See also
 List of scientific journals in mathematics education

External links
Journal web site
Online table of contents

Mathematics education

References/Endnotes

Publications established in 1998
Mathematics education journals